Girl in the Woods is a 1958 drama film directed by Tom Gries. It stars Forrest Tucker and Margaret Hayes.

Plot
Steve and Bell Cory arrive in timber country, where Bell is eager to begin a new life, tired of moving from place to place and weary of Steve's gambling habit. A lumber baron, Whitlock, has recently laid claim to land belonging to another man, who begins poaching logs from him.

Whitlock's foreman, Big Jim, offers a job to Steve, who must fend off romantic advances from Jim's young and restless daughter, Sonda. In a snit over Steve's rejection, Sonda helps point out the whereabout of the man Whitlock's after, who is then shot, with Steve being blamed. Bell is furious with Steve's behavior until finally realizing that none of it has been his fault.

Cast
Forrest Tucker as Steve Cory
Margaret Hayes as Bell Cory
Barton MacLane as Big Jim
Diana Francis as Sonda
Murvyn Vye as Whitlock

References

External links

 

1958 films
Films directed by Tom Gries
Films scored by Albert Glasser
Films set in forests
Films about lumberjacks
Republic Pictures films
1958 drama films
1950s English-language films
American drama films
1950s American films